Colton is a district of east Leeds, West Yorkshire, England, situated between Cross Gates to the north, Halton and Halton Moor to the west, Whitkirk to the north-west and Austhorpe to the north-east. Temple Newsam lies directly south of the estate.

The area falls within the Temple Newsam ward of Leeds City Council and Leeds East parliamentary constituency.

The small Whitkirk Lane End estate (which is situated between Colton Road and Colton Roundabout) is often considered more part of the Colton district than Whitkirk, because of its separation from Whitkirk via Selby Road, and its proximity to Colton Road.

Etymology
The name of Colton is first attested the Domesday Book of 1086 as Coletun. The name comes from Old English. The first element is the personal name Cola (which originated as a nickname deriving from Old English col 'coal', referring to black hair or dark complexion), and the second is the word tūn ('estate, farm'). Thus the name once meant 'Cola's estate'.

Geography

The village consists mainly of cul-de-sacs, with inter-linking ginnels, back alleys and housing ranges from detached houses, semi-detached houses, terraced houses, and flats. The area is 4 miles to the east of Leeds city centre, and is close to the A63 dual carriageway and M1 motorway. Colton is also the area of Leeds where the Leeds Outer Ring Road terminates. The area is well served by buses, with the numbers 19 and 19A going to and from the city centre, and the number 9 going to and from Seacroft.

At the centre of the estate, there is a cricket club, with a bar, a cricket pitch, two tennis courts, crown green bowling club and a football pitch. Much of the open space in Colton has been built upon, making it a much more urban area. Colton Methodist Church is situated in the "old" part of the village.

Old Colton Road
Colton Road is a derelict road running through the west of the area into Whitkirk. It joins onto Selby Road, although it has been closed from the edge of Colton and Whitkirk to Meynell Road, where it terminates in the centre of the estate. It is locally referred to as 'The Old Road', 'The Red Road' or 'The Wide Path'.

Football teams
Colton has some very promising young football teams that are being developed. The funding for these football teams comes from Colton Club. The football teams go all the way up to the Under 18s. After that it becomes Colton Open Age. There is also a girls football team that is for all ages.

Location grid

See also
Listed buildings in Leeds (Temple Newsam Ward)

References

External links

 
Colton website

Places in Leeds